"I Found You" is a song by British-Irish boy band The Wanted. The single was released on 6 November 2012 as the second single from their third studio album, Word of Mouth (2013). The track received its first radio play on 7 September 2012, but was previewed on the band's official website the day before.

Background
Nathan Sykes told Digital Spy about the song: "We're doing a video for it in a couple of weeks as well in LA, which is really exciting. We are just trying to lock down all the ideas for it now." Max George added: "We've been working on our next album for, like, the last six months, but it's still not ready yet. We're still working away on that and we've got plenty more travelling to do yet, so I'm not actually sure when the album is going to be ready."

The music video for the track was filmed on the week beginning 27 August in Los Angeles. In a preview shot from the video, Nathan is chased by a group of mental fans. Later, a new video was filmed due to undisclosed reasons, and that one was shot in London. This video became the official "I Found You" video. The video was released on 15 October 2012.  The video is directed by Chris Marrs Piliero, who also directed Kesha's "Blow", and Britney Spears's "Criminal" and "I Wanna Go". The video filmed in LA was later posted on YouTube on 23 January 2013. The song is written in the key of A minor.

Music videos
The video features Storm model Chloe Lloyd. It starts with a shot of a woman, played by Lloyd, who has been tied up and gagged. The Wanted are seen walking somewhere while singing their parts. Max is seen holding a boxer. Scenes of them at a party are shown, where Nathan is seen talking to the same woman as an unknown man watches them. They reach a house which is later revealed to be the location where the woman has been kidnapped and the kidnapper is the same man from the party. They enter the house and fight the man's henchmen. They manage to take out all of them as Nathan approaches the woman who has been kidnapped and kisses her passionately. He steals a key from the woman's belt, gets up, winks, then leaves. The woman realizes that he is the man she talked to at the party. Nathan hands Tom the key and the guys depart the house, leaving the woman still tied up. In the end, they fish out a box from the sea, and open it with the key. The video ends as they open the box containing diamonds. They are satisfied with the box and its contents and close it.

On 21 January 2013, a second version of the video was released on The Wanted's YouTube page. The video starts with an older gentleman introducing The Wanted in a black and white screen. As the entire audience (of females) go completely crazy over the band. Soon after the video goes to full colour as the screaming fans get louder. Right around the middle of the music video, the fans start invading the stage, forcing The Wanted to escape through the back door, as Nathan sings the bridge on a ladder. Soon after the boys are able to runaway safely to their limousine. Two hours later the band starts looking through photos of their performance in their limo and notice that Nathan is missing, and then Nathan is seen running away from many screaming females.

Track listing

 The Remixes
 "I Found You" (Bob Sinclar Remix) - 4:58
 "I Found You" (Bob Sinclar Edit) - 3:07
 "I Found You" (Moto Blanco Club Mix) - 7:22
 "I Found You" (Moto Blanco Edit) - 4:02
 "I Found You" (Joe Gauthreaux & Warren Rigg Club Mix) - 7:47
 "I Found You" (Joe Gauthreaux & Warren Rigg Radio Mix) - 4:05
 "I Found You" (Joe Gauthreaux & Warren Rigg Dub Mix) - 7:34
 "I Found You" (Steve Pitron & Max Sanna Remix) - 3:40
 "I Found You" (Steve Pitron & Max Sanna Club Mix) - 6:35

Charts

Weekly charts

Year-end charts

Certifications

See also
 List of number-one dance singles of 2013 (U.S.)

References

2012 singles
The Wanted songs
Dance-pop songs
Eurodance songs
Island Records singles
Mercury Records singles
Music videos directed by Chris Marrs Piliero
Songs written by Wayne Hector
Songs written by Steve Mac
Songs written by Ina Wroldsen
Song recordings produced by Steve Mac
2012 songs